Chile Route 60 is a main road in the Valparaíso Region of Chile that extends from Valparaíso to Paso Los Libertadores. It continues into Argentina as National Route 7, toward Mendoza.

The Route 60 is made up of two separate stretches of road. One goes from the port of Valparaíso to the junction with Chile Route 5 at La Calera. The other stretch extends from Route 5 at Llaillay to the border with Argentina. The actual border crossing is in the 3 km long Cristo Redentor tunnel. The route roughly parallels the course of the Aconcagua River.

Places along the route
Valparaíso
Viña del Mar
Quillota
La Calera
Llaillay
San Felipe
Los Andes
Portillo

Roads in Chile
Transport in Valparaíso Region